Cleisostoma sagittatum is a species of orchid found in Borneo, Java, the Philippines and Sumatra. This species was first described by Blume in 1825.

References

External links 

sagittatum
Orchids of the Philippines
Orchids of Sumatra
Orchids of Java
Orchids of Borneo